Dana Michelle Nessel (born April 19, 1969) is an American politician and lawyer serving as the 54th Attorney General of Michigan since January 2019. She is a member of the Democratic Party.

Nessel is the second openly lesbian woman elected attorney general of a state in the United States (after Maura Healey) and the first openly LGBT person elected to statewide office in Michigan. She is also the first Jew elected Attorney General of Michigan.

In 2014, Nessel successfully argued for the plaintiffs in DeBoer v. Snyder, which challenged Michigan's ban on the statewide legal recognition of same-sex marriage; the case was eventually combined with others and appealed to the Supreme Court of the United States as Obergefell v. Hodges, which led to the nationwide legal recognition of same-sex marriage. In 2016, she founded Fair Michigan, a nonprofit organization that works to prosecute hate crimes against the LGBT community.

Early life and education 
In 1987, Nessel graduated from West Bloomfield High School in West Bloomfield Township, Michigan. She played soccer and was named All-State. She earned her bachelor's degree from the University of Michigan and her Juris Doctor from Wayne State University Law School.

After graduating law school, Nessel worked as an assistant prosecutor in the Wayne County Prosecutor's Office for eleven years. She was the primary attorney on over 1,665 cases dealing with homicides, armed robberies, child abuse, sex crimes, carjackings and drug crimes.

In 2005, Nessel opened her own legal firm, Nessel and Kessel Law, where she handled criminal defense cases, civil rights actions, family law matters, and general tort litigation. While in private practice, she successfully represented the plaintiffs in DeBoer v. Snyder (2014).

Michigan Attorney General (2019–present) 

In 2018, Nessel won the Democratic Party nomination for Michigan Attorney General over former U.S. Attorney for Western Michigan Patrick Miles Jr., and narrowly defeated Republican state House Speaker Tom Leonard and three other candidates in the general election. She succeeded term-limited Republican Bill Schuette who ran unsuccessfully for the office of Governor.

Nessel was sworn into office on January 1, 2019. She is the first openly gay person and first openly LGBTQ person elected to statewide office in Michigan. She is the first Democrat to serve as attorney general since Jennifer Granholm left the office in 2003, a gap of 16 years.

Nessel immediately withdrew Michigan from several federal lawsuits initiated by Schuette involving the separation of church and state, LGBTQ discrimination, environmental protection, and abortion.

Hate Crimes Unit 
After a rise of hate crimes in Michigan for two years in a row, Nessel launched a Hate Crimes Unit within the Criminal Division of the Department of Attorney General that is charged with investigating and prosecuting hate crimes. Before Nessel took office, the Michigan Department of Attorney General did not have any prosecutors or investigators assigned solely to hate crime issues.

Conviction Integrity Unit 
Nessel launched a new Conviction Integrity Unit within the Department of Attorney General's Criminal Appellate Division. The unit investigates credible claims of innocence and rectifies wrongful convictions. To do this, officials work with county prosecutors, law enforcement officials, defense attorneys, and innocence clinic projects.

Consumer Protection Division 
Under her Consumer Protection Division, Nessel launched the state's first Payroll Fraud Enforcement Unit to investigate Michigan establishments that illegally misclassify workers or  withhold wages and benefits. She also established the Department's Auto Insurance Fraud Unit, which received over 3,000 cases after only four months.

Keeping her promise to protect and defend consumers and ratepayers, Nessel saved utility customers $3.6 million after intervening in SEMCO Energy's gas recovery plan case. As of the end of 2019, Nessel has helped save Michigan utility ratepayers a combined $355,809,700.

Elder Abuse Task Force 
In collaboration with the Michigan Supreme Court, Nessel launched the Michigan Elder Abuse Task Force to combat physical abuse, financial exploitation, emotional abuse, and neglect of senior citizens. Nearly 50 different organizations including law enforcement, state agencies, the Michigan House of Representatives, Michigan Senate, Michigan Congressional delegation, and advocacy groups, have joined the task force. The task force initiatives include requiring professional guardians to become certified, developing statutory basic rights for families, reviewing the process of a guardian removing a ward from their home, and limiting the number of wards per guardian.

Robocall crackdown effort 
Nessel started a state-wide campaign to crack down on illegal robocalls targeting Michigan residents. This campaign includes initiatives to educate the public, toughen enforcement, and update state law. As of March 2020, over 2,400 caller complaints of illegal robocalls had been received by Nessel's office.

Additionally, Nessel joined a bipartisan group of state attorneys general in filing a brief with the United States Supreme Court for the case Barr et al. v. American Association of Political Consultants Inc. et al. arguing to preserve the anti-robocall provisions of the federal Telephone Consumer Protection Act.

Target of antisemitic threat 

On March 2, 2023, Dana Nessel announced that she was among several Jewish government officials targeted in antisemitic threats made on social media by a heavily armed Michigan man. According to a complaint unsealed by federal authorities, Jack Eugene Carpenter III was charged with transmitting an interstate threat, a felony carrying a five-year sentence. Carpenter was accused of "threatening to carry out the punishment of death to anyone that is Jewish in the Michigan government" in a February 2023 Tweet. Carpenter possessed three handguns, a shotgun, two rifles, and was under investigation for theft of a handgun according to federal prosecutors. He was accused of making the threat in Texas and has been charged in the Eastern District of Michigan. Commenting on the threat on Twitter, Nessel stated: "It is my sincere hope that the federal authorities take this offense just as seriously as my Hate Crimes & Domestic Terrorism Unit takes plots to murder elected officials."

High-profile cases and investigations

Catholic Church investigation 
Nessel took over the department's investigation into sex abuse allegations against the Catholic Church from former Attorney General Bill Schuette. As of December 2019, the Department of Attorney General has received 641 tips on its clergy abuse hotline, identified 270 priests alleged to be abusers from dioceses in Marquette, Gaylord, and Grand Rapids, and received allegations involving 552 victims of clergy sexual abuse since the beginning of the investigation. So far, 1.5 million paper documents and 3.5 million electronic documents have been seized. The investigation team has reviewed 130 cases for potential charges, 50 of which were closed because the statute of limitations barred prosecution or the priest in question had died. Twenty-five cases have been referred back to the diocese for action because the priests were in active ministry. As of January 2020, nine priests have been charged and two have pleaded guilty. In October 2020, Nessel released the results of a two-year investigation she conducted which accused 454 priests of sexually abusing 811 people in the state of Michigan.

Michigan State University investigation 
In light of the Larry Nassar scandal, The Michigan Department of Attorney General launched an investigation into Michigan State University (MSU). Nessel has charged three former university employees with ties to Nassar. Kathie Klages, the head coach for MSU's gymnastics team while Nassar was team doctor; Lou Anna Simon, who was MSU president during the investigation; and William Strampel, former dean of the Michigan State University College of Osteopathic Medicine.

Nessel says that there is still more to investigate, but that the department is at an impasse with MSU as they continue to withhold more than 6,000 documents under the claim of attorney-client privilege. Nessel, survivors, and activists continue to call on the university to release the documents.

Enbridge Line 5 lawsuits 
In 2018, Michigan passed legislation approved under former Governor Rick Snyder codifying an agreement between the state and Enbridge Energy to replace the Enbridge Line 5, sitting on the lakebed underneath the Straits of Mackinac with a tunnel below the bedrock. Despite a judge's ruling upholding the law in March 2019, Nessel issued an opinion that month stating the law was unconstitutional “because its provisions go beyond the scope of what was disclosed in its title.”. After Enbridge filed a lawsuit, a Michigan Court of Claims judge ruled in favor of Enbridge and rejected Nessel's reasoning, stating, "the argument advanced by defendants misses the mark."

Upon appeal to the Michigan Court of Appeals, Nessel's request to overturn the Court of Claims decision was denied and her opinion was again overruled, allowing Enbridge to continue work on the tunnel and requiring the state to process the necessary permits.

In June 2019, Nessel filed suit independently in Ingham County Circuit Court for a Line 5 shut down “after reasonable notice” and a permanent decommissioning of the controversial oil and gas pipeline. The lawsuit argues that the operation of Line 5 violates the public trust doctrine, is a common law public nuisance, and violates the Michigan Environmental Protection Act because of its likeliness to cause pollution to and destruction of the Great Lakes and other natural resources. The attorneys general of Minnesota, Wisconsin and California have filed friend-of-the-court briefs in support of Nessel's lawsuit.

PFAS contamination lawsuit 
In January 2020, Nessel filed suit against seventeen companies, including 3M and DuPont, alleging the toxic per- and polyfluoroalkyl (PFAS) chemical manufacturers “intentionally hid” known health and environmental risks from the public and state while continuing to sell the PFAS chemicals since the 1950s. The suit seeks to hold the companies financially responsible for all past and future costs associated with the contamination at dozens of sites across the state of Michigan.

Flint Water Crisis investigation

Campaign 
While campaigning to become Attorney General for Michigan, Nessel made a series of statements regarding the Flint Water Crisis and its investigation leading up to the 2018 Michigan Attorney General election which took place on November 6, 2018.

 On April 4, 2018, then-candidate Nessel met with community members at the Flint Public Library and spoke with NBC 25, a local television station which serves Flint and the Tri-Cities area. If elected, Nessel said she would not be held to corporate interests, and would protect the citizens of Flint. "The last thing we need is to have people in government that poison their own residents, that engage in cover-ups, or who use a terrible incident like that to politicize the office of attorney general and use it for their own personal gain. We need someone who just cares about our state residents once again and that’s what I want to do,” said Nessel.
 On October 12, 2018 Nessel told WDET-FM, a public radio station in Detroit, she "did not believe that these cases have been handled correctly.” Nessel hinted at the possibility of withdrawing or dismissing charges, saying "whether or not there are bad actors that should have been charged or not, including the governor, I think that has to be reevaluated and reexamined,” she says.
 Nessel had told the Macomb Daily on October 18, 2018 she "could see [the potential for expanded prosecutions]" and "did not agree with the way the prosecutions [had] unfolded." Nessel cited her opposition to Todd Flood, a prominent donor to then Governor Rick Snyder, being named as the crisis' special prosecutor who would potentially investigate Snyder.
 That same day, Nessel had told Michigan Radio she was "suspect of [the Flint] investigation quite frankly from the beginning. Nessel felt "political expediency was being prioritized instead of justice." As Attorney General, she said she would "take a second look at the investigation, make certain that all of the people who have charges pending have been charged properly and look to see if there’s anyone who should have been charged, but who hasn’t been."
 In a series of three videos produced and released between September and October 2018 by her campaign, "Dana Nessel For Michigan Attorney General," Nessel stood before Michigan's waterways and promised a tough stance on justice for the city of Flint along with committing to other protections regarding clean water for Michiganders.

Dismissal of charges 
After assuming office and taking over the investigation of the Flint Water Crisis from former Attorney General Bill Schuette, Nessel announced that she would be handling the settlements of the 79 Flint civil lawsuits while Solicitor General Fadwa Hammoud and Wayne County Prosecutor Kym Worthy would handle the criminal cases.

On June 13, 2019, Michigan Attorney General Nessel's office dismissed all pending criminal cases tied to the Flint water crisis. Under Michigan's previous attorney general, a Republican, 15 people were charged with crimes related to the water crisis. Several pleaded no contest and were convicted. Prosecutorial overreach possibly tainting the judicial process plagued the investigation from the beginning.

The dismissal effectively ended prosecutions of eight current and former officials accused of neglecting their duties and allowing Flint residents to drink tainted, dangerous water. Children of Flint drank poisoned water with dangerous quantities of lead. At least 12 people died in a Legionnaires’ outbreak that prosecutors linked to the water change. Among the officials whose charges were dropped: the former director of the Michigan Department of Health and Human Services, a state epidemiologist, a former Flint public works director and emergency managers who had been appointed to oversee the city. Some defendants had faced charges as serious as involuntary manslaughter. The defence lawyer for Howard Croft, the former Flint public works director who was charged with involuntary manslaughter, said the "attorney general’s decision validated his concerns about the investigation" and credited Nessel's "courage" in deciding to dismiss all criminal charges.

The decision to dismiss all charges was met with considerable outrage from Michiganders, clean water activists, and residents of Flint, the latter who felt their crisis was being forgotten. Prosecutors Fadwa Hammoud and Kym Worthy, who oversaw the case, blamed missteps by the previous prosecution team for their office's decision, citing "immediate and grave concerns about the investigative approach and legal theories." Hammoud and Worthy noted they were not precluded from refiling charges against the defendants or adding new charges and defendants.

Nessel defended her prosecutors’ decision to drop the charges, but also sought to assuage the concerns of Flint residents, stating "justice delayed is not always justice denied."

Nessel has since opened the first ever satellite location of the Attorney General's Office in Flint. Two victim advocates reside in the office along with the Flint Water Crisis prosecution team.

Opioid manufacturers lawsuit 
Nessel filed a lawsuit on behalf of the state of Michigan in December 2019 against opioid distributors using a law to pursue drug dealers. Nessel said that Michigan is the first state to sue drug manufacturers in this way. The companies involved in the suit are Illinois-based Walgreens, Ohio-based Cardinal Health Inc., Texas-based McKesson Corporation, and Pennsylvania-based AmerisourceBergen Drug Corporation. According to the suit, the defendant drug companies sold opioids “in ways that facilitated and encouraged their flow into the illegal, secondary market” without proper safeguards, and they failed to monitor or report suspicious orders, including by knowingly selling pain pills to so-called pill mills. The damages against the defendants are projected to exceed $1 billion.

St. Vincent adoption agency lawsuit 
Shortly after taking office, Nessel changed state policy to require that contracts with adoption agencies refusing to work directly with LGBT couples be terminated; previously, such agencies had been allowed (and been required) to refer LGBT couples to different adoption agencies. The St. Vincent adoption agency, a Catholic organization, sued Nessel, asking to be allowed to continue operating under state contract as before the new policy. U.S. District Judge Robert Jonker ruled in favor of the adoption agency, writing that "the state's new position targets St. Vincent's religious beliefs." Nessel requested a stay of the ruling, but Jonker denied this as well, stating, "the state has offered nothing new and has failed to come to grips with the factual basis on the preliminary injunction record that supports the inference of religious targeting in this case." In March 2022, the state agreed to pay $550,000 to reimburse St. Vincent's legal fees, along with an additional $250,000 to Catholic Charities of West Michigan, also to reimburse legal fees in a similar case.

Allegations of Anti-Catholicism 
Throughout her tenure as Attorney General for Michigan, Nessel has been accused of engaging in a pattern of anti Catholic actions and making denigrating remarks about Catholicism. In her lawsuit involving Catholic adoption agencies, Nessel publicly referred to both the agencies and their supporters, as ‘hate mongers,” and has been accused of harboring an "animus" towards the Catholic agencies. Nessel has suggested that she thinks retired Judge Michael Talbot is unfit to help Michigan State University overhaul its Title IX hearing procedures, due to the fact that he is Catholic and previously worked with the Roman Catholic Diocese of Saginaw. In her prosecution of sex abuse cases involving Catholic clergy, Nessel stated "If an investigator comes to your door and asks to speak with you, please ask to see their badge and not their rosary," a statement that commentators condemned as an insensitive barb aimed at the Catholic devotional practice of praying the rosary. Michigan State Representative Beau LaFave remarked that there is a "clear pattern of anti-Catholic religious bigotry coming out of our attorney general, and somebody needs to do something about it." Commentators Dawud Walid and Paul Long spoke out against the remarks by Nessel, stating "Articles of faith and sacred symbols of Michiganians should not be disrespected or denigrated by any elected official in our state irrespective of political party, much less the person who has been entrusted to uphold justice and fairness for everyone regardless of their religious affiliation. Regrettably, Nessel has yet to apologize for her statement about the rosary beads." She has also spoken out condemning the Catholic Church's doctrine on birth control.

Affordable Care Act lawsuit 
Shortly after assuming office, Nessel joined a coalition of other attorneys general in a lawsuit to support the Affordable Care Act. Nessel cites the “hundreds and thousands” of residents in Michigan who would lose access to healthcare, particularly those with pre-existing conditions, as her reason for joining the suit. The U.S. Supreme Court agreed to hear the case in 2021.

Trump fake electors plot 
Nessel announced in January 2022 that after a months-long investigation into the Michigan certificate in the Trump fake electors plot, she had asked the Justice Department to open a criminal investigation, closing the Michigan investigation. Deputy attorney general Lisa Monaco days later confirmed the Justice Department was examining the matter. Nessel announced in January 2023 that she was reopening her investigation "because I don't know what the federal government plans to do."

Personal life 
Nessel met her wife Alanna Maguire while they were both working on the legal case DeBoer v. Snyder which was ultimately successful in striking down Michigan's ban on same-sex marriage. Nessel proposed to Maguire in 2015 outside of the United States Supreme Court. The couple married in July 2015 with the marriage being officiated by Judge Bernard Friedman, the judge who had originally struck down Michigan's same-sex marriage ban in March 2014.

Nessel and Alanna have twin sons, Alex and Zach.

Awards

Electoral history

References

External links 

Office of the Attorney General
Campaign website

1969 births
Living people
21st-century American Jews
21st-century American politicians
21st-century American women politicians
21st-century LGBT people
American LGBT politicians
American Jews from Michigan
Jewish American people in Michigan politics
Lesbian politicians
LGBT people from Michigan
LGBT Jews
LGBT lawyers
Michigan Attorneys General
Michigan Democrats
University of Michigan alumni
Wayne State University Law School alumni
Women in Michigan politics
Women state constitutional officers of Michigan